Winston Wen-Yang Wong OBE (born 2 April 1951 in Taipei County (now New Taipei City), Taiwan) is the eldest son of Wang Yung-ching, chair of the Formosa Plastics Group (FPG), by his second wife. Wong is now a widower with a son and a daughter after his wife died of stomach cancer in 2007. Wong holds degrees in physics, applied optics, and chemical engineering from Imperial College London. His English name was chosen during his study in the United Kingdom.

Career
Wong was executive vice president of Nan Ya Plastics, an FPG subsidiary, until a widely publicized affair (and the resulting 14% drop in FPG stocks) led to his dismissal in December 1995.  His father then “banished” Wong to the United States, where he spent one year teaching at the business school of the University of California, Berkeley.  While in the United States, Wong met Jiang Mianheng, son of Jiang Zemin, the General Secretary of the Communist Party of China at that time.

In 2000, Wong and Jiang Mianheng co-founded the US$1.63 billion Grace Semiconductor Manufacturing Corp. joint venture in Shanghai, China.  Though Wong serves as president and CEO of that company, Wong himself is not a stockholder, due to cross-strait investment restrictions imposed by the Republic of China (ROC).  Wong also serves as chair of the Hung Jen Group (宏仁集團) and chair of the Grace THW Group (宏仁企业集团), which are heavily invested in mainland China’s petrochemical and electronics industries, respectively.

The Winston Wong Centre for Bio-Inspired Technology was created at Imperial College London in 2009.

In 2015, Wong was named to “Top 100 Chinese for Economic Achievements and Contributions” list by Management World Magazine.

Support for trade agreements Between Taiwan-NAFTA/United States
As an entrepreneur, Wong has long been a vocal supporter for increased levels of trade cooperation between Taiwan and the West, and free trade agreements in general.  On 26 February 2012, Forbes featured an OP/ED written by Wong in which he discussed, “A Free Trade Agenda For the U.S. and Taiwan”. The premise of the article being that despite global exports totaling $274 billion in 2010, Taiwan has had difficulty establishing a footprint in substantial global trade agreements. Because of Taiwan’s complex diplomatic relations, it has had trouble entering substantial trade pacts with the economic powerhouses of the United States and North American Free Trade Agreement.

Even so, Wong argues that free-trade agreements with several Central American nations, as well as with Singapore have proven Taiwan worthy of inclusion. Wong has pointed to the increased quality of life from “survivor” to “consumer” and entrance into the middle class for millions of people in China, India, and Brazil in advocacy for increased trade cooperation with Taiwan.

Moon Regan TransAntarctic Expedition sponsorship
In June 2010, Wong agreed to be the main sponsor of the Moon-Regan Trans-Antarctic expedition led by Andrew Regan and Andrew Moon. The Expedition will travel 3,600 miles across Antarctica, from Patriot Hills on the west coast to the South Pole, heading north from there through the Trans-Antarctic Mountain Range, down the Leverett Glacier and across the Ross Ice Shelf to the coast at McMurdo.

The expedition has partnered with Imperial College London to carry out a wide range of scientific objectives. The team is travelling in three vehicles across Antarctica, including two mobile laboratories and the Winston Wong Bio-Inspired Ice Vehicle (WWBIV). The WWBIV will be the first bio-fuelled vehicle on Antarctica to endeavour to reach the Geographic South Pole.

References

External links
Moon-Regan TransAntarcticExpedition Website
Winston Wong Centre for Bio-Inspired Technology

1951 births
Living people
Alumni of Imperial College London
Businesspeople from New Taipei
20th-century Taiwanese businesspeople
Taiwanese people of Hoklo descent
Haas School of Business faculty
Officers of the Order of the British Empire
21st-century Taiwanese businesspeople
Taiwanese expatriates in the United Kingdom